Castelló de la Plana railway station  is the central railway station of Castelló de la Plana, Spain. The station is part of Adif and it accommodates AVE high-speed trains, as well as RENFE Alvia long-distance and medium-distance trains.

Services

References

Railway stations in the Valencian Community
Railway stations in Spain opened in 2010